Matt McCall may refer to:

Matt McCall (racing driver) (born 1981), American racing driver and NASCAR crew chief
Matt McCall (basketball), American college basketball coach